Muhammad Nadi Pasha (born 1836 – death date unknown) was an Egyptian General. He served as Deputy Governor of Sudan, was then promoted to the rank of Mirmiran and served as Governor General of Harar and its independents, the area which now includes Somalia, Djibouti, Eritrea and East Ethiopia.

Nadi Pasha also served as acting Governor General of Sudan in 1882.

As governor of Harar
In Harar, Nadi Pasha forced the troops to observe a strict discipline and organized the city police. He also had walls constructed around Harar.

Nadi Pasha always regarded trade, especially trade with the Europeans, as essential to the prosperity of Harar. He encouraged Europeans to undertake the business of the city, though he insisted that the main wealth of the country was in agriculture.

Nadi Pasha allowed the Catholic Mission to freely practice her religion in Harar and even allowed the ringing of bells, displaying remarkable religious tolerance, considering the historical period.

Later career
Nadi Pasha also played a major role in ending the slave trade in the Horn of Africa.

At the end of his career in 1897, Nadi Pasha was appointed Prince of Pilgrimage (Hajj).

References

External links
Harar Under Egyptian Rule, by E. Sylvia Pankhurst
Photo

1836 births
History of Sudan
Sudanese military personnel
Sudanese politicians
Year of death unknown